Rahta Pimplas is a city and a municipal council in the Ahmednagar district in the Indian state of Maharashtra.

Demographics
 India census, Rahta Pimplas had a population of 19,024. Males constitute 51% of the population and females 49%. Rahta Pimplas has an average literacy rate of 72%, higher than the national average of 59.5%: male literacy is 79%, and female literacy is 65%. In Rahta Pimplas, 13% of the population is under 6 years of age.

References

Cities and towns in Ahmednagar district